Colby is a semi-hard orange cheese made from cow's milk. It is named after the city of Colby, Wisconsin, US, where it was first developed in 1885 and quickly became popular.

Colby is manufactured in a similar process as cheddar cheese. Instead of the cheddaring process, however, the whey is partially drained after the curd is cooked, and cold water is added to decrease the temperature of the mixture. Traditionally, Colby has an open texture with irregular holes and is pressed into a cylindrical form called a longhorn. The washed-curd process results in a cheese with a mild flavor that is moister and softer than cheddar. Colby is typically used in snacks, sandwiches, and salads.

Derivatives include Colby-Jack, a marble cheese produced by mixing Colby and Monterey Jack curds, and Pinconning cheese, a style of Colby that was developed in Michigan. The city of Colby considers the cheese an important part of its history and organizes an annual festival to promote Colby cheese, and there have been several proposals in the Wisconsin state legislature to designate Colby the official state cheese.

History

In 1882, Ambrose and Susan Steinwand established a cheese factory near Colby, Wisconsin, on a  site they had purchased five years before. The Steinwands' son Joseph developed the cheese at the factory in 1885 when he was handling a batch of cheddar cheese and washed the curd with cold water. There are differing accounts on whether the creation was intentional. According to some sources, Joseph had attended a cheesemaking course and was specifically interested in developing a new type of cheese; according to others, he neglected to drain the excess moisture after adding cold water and accidentally discovered the result. The resulting cheese, which was moister than cheddar, was named after the nearby city and quickly became popular because it did not involve the complicated cheddaring process.

By 1896, the family was producing US$3000 worth of cheese each year. Though Ambrose and Joseph Steinwand have traditionally been credited for its development, the historian Joan M. Jensen notes that cheesemaking at the time typically involved the entire family, including women who were often expert cheesemakers. In 1898, the Colby Phonograph reported that "a merchant in Phillips gives as one of the 13 reasons why people should trade with him, that he sells the genuine Steinwand Colby Cheese." The city of Colby has organized an annual festival in July, "Colby Cheese Days", to promote the cheese since 1965.

There have been several proposals to make Colby the official state cheese of Wisconsin and to add the designation to the Wisconsin Blue Book published by the state government. In 1998, the city of Colby adopted a resolution supporting the measure and the Wisconsin State Assembly voted 81–15 in support, but the bill was not voted on by the Senate. A similar measure was introduced in 2019 but did not receive a vote in either the Assembly or the Senate. In 2021, the bill was introduced again in an Assembly committee by state representative Donna Rozar and state senator Kathy Bernier, with Joseph Steinwand's great-granddaughter speaking in support of the measure. Supporters of the bill said that it commemorates Wisconsin's dairy history, while critics argued that a special designation for Colby could undermine the sales of other cheeses, including cheddar and mozzarella, that are also produced in the state.

Production

The manufacturing process for Colby is similar to that of cheddar cheese, except that the mixture does not go through the cheddaring process. Cow's milk that has been standardized to a protein–fat ratio of 0.96 undergoes pasteurization and is stored at  while the starter Lactococcus lactis (subspecies lactis and/or cremoris) is added. The mixture is left to set for 15 to 30 minutes. The curd is then cut and cooked at  until the pH of the whey is about 6.2 to 6.3.

Next, instead of draining all of the whey and cheddaring the remaining curds, only about two-thirds of the whey is drained until the curds break the surface. After washing with the cold water for 15 minutes, the mixture is fully drained and salt is added to the curd. This process produces  of cheese per  of milk. Monterey Jack has a similar manufacturing process, with the difference of allowing the curd to sit after draining the whey until it reaches a pH of 5.3. In this form, it is also known as a "longhorn". The cheese can also be pressed into a rectangular form with smaller rectangles or half-moon shapes cut from it.

In its annual report on the dairy industry, the United States Department of Agriculture (USDA) groups together "other American varieties" of cheese, including Colby, Monterey Jack, and other washed- and stirred-curd varieties. In 2020, the USDA reported that the United States produced  of these cheeses at 144 plants. Wisconsin was the leading state with  produced at 44 plants, and California produced  of cheese at 11 plants.

Character

Colby is a semi-hard cheese. Its washed-curd process produces a moister and softer texture than cheddar. The reduced acidity of the curd results in a mild and milky flavor and it gets its orange color from annatto. Compared to more crumbly cheeses such as Cheshire, Colby is relatively elastic because its whey is drained at a high pH. The standard of identity in the United States, according to Title 21 of the Code of Federal Regulations, dictates that Colby must have a moisture content of 40% or less and that the solids content must contain at least 50% milkfat. In practice, the solids content is typically 52–53%, resulting in a total fat content of 31–32%, and the salt content is usually 1.5–1.8%. Compared to cheddar, the calcium content is slightly lower. Traditional Colby has an open texture with irregular holes. This aspect used to be required by its standard of identity in Wisconsin, but the requirement was removed due to vacuum packaging removing the holes from the cheese and creating a compact texture.

The higher moisture content of Colby compared to cheddar leads to a weak body and it does not keep its quality for as long. It often develops a bitter taste and becomes extremely soft after 100 days, and is typically recommended to be consumed within three months. Foodborne bacteria including Listeria monocytogenes, Staphylococcus aureus, and Salmonella are more likely to grow in cheeses with a moisture content greater than 50% than in hard or semi-hard cheeses like Colby.

Uses and derivatives

Because of its mild flavor, Colby is seldom used in cooking. Instead, it is typically used as a table cheese and in snacks, sandwiches, and salads. It can also be grated and combined with other cheeses for use on pizza.

Colby can be mixed with Monterey Jack to produce a marble cheese known as "Colby-Jack" or "Co-Jack". The colored Colby and non-colored Monterey Jack curds are mixed before the pressing and ripening steps, resulting in the marbled effect. It is a popular cheese; in 2006, an estimated  of Colby-Jack was sold in supermarkets, more than either Colby's or Monterey Jack's individual sales.

Pinconning cheese is a style of Colby named after Pinconning, Michigan, where it was created in 1915 by Dan Horn, who had moved to the city from Wisconsin. Horn created the cheese in response to an excess of cows and milk in the city. Pinconning cheese has been consumed over a wide range of aging periods, including as long as 16 years.

See also

Cuisine of Wisconsin
Wisconsin dairy industry

References

External links

Colby cheese grades and standards set by the United States Department of Agriculture

American cheeses
Cow's-milk cheeses
Cuisine of Wisconsin
Products introduced in 1885